Frank Howell Seay (born September 5, 1938) is an inactive Senior United States district judge of the United States District Court for the Eastern District of Oklahoma.

Education and career

Born in Shawnee, Oklahoma, Seay received a Bachelor of Arts degree from University of Oklahoma in 1961. He received a Bachelor of Laws from University of Oklahoma College of Law in 1963. He was in private practice of law in Seminole, Oklahoma from 1963 to 1966. He was the county attorney of Seminole County, Oklahoma from 1963 to 1966. He was the first assistant district attorney of 22nd Judicial District of Oklahoma from 1967 to 1968. He was an Associate judge of the District Court of Oklahoma in Seminole County from 1968 to 1974. He was a judge of the 22nd Judicial District Court of Oklahoma from 1974 to 1979.

Federal judicial service

Seay was nominated by President Jimmy Carter on September 28, 1979, to a seat on the United States District Court for the Eastern District of Oklahoma vacated by Judge Joseph Wilson Morris. He was confirmed by the United States Senate on October 31, 1979, and received his commission on November 2, 1979. He served as Chief Judge from 1980 to 1996. He assumed senior status on September 25, 2003. As of 2020, Seay is the last judge appointed by a Democratic president to the Eastern District of Oklahoma.

Ada affair

Seay was instrumental in reversing the miscarriages of justice that led to the convictions of Ronald Keith Williamson and Dennis Fritz for the murder of Debbie Carter in Ada, Oklahoma, events that were documented in John Grisham's non-fiction book The Innocent Man. He is quoted as attaching to an epilogue of his legal opinion: "God help us, if ever in this great country we turn our heads while people who have not had fair trials are executed. That almost happened in this case".

Personal

Seay's paternal grandfather was a full-blooded Native American. Seay did not discover his Native American heritage, likely Cherokee, until after he was appointed to the federal bench. Nevertheless, Seay was the first Native American appointed to a federal bench in the United States.

See also
List of Native American jurists

References

Sources
 

1938 births
Living people
20th-century American judges
21st-century American judges
20th-century American lawyers
Judges of the United States District Court for the Eastern District of Oklahoma
Native American judges
Oklahoma state court judges
People from Shawnee, Oklahoma
United States district court judges appointed by Jimmy Carter
University of Oklahoma alumni
University of Oklahoma College of Law alumni